Penthe obliquata is a species of polypore fungus beetle in the family Tetratomidae. It is found in North America.

This species is primarily dark-colored with a characteristic, brightly-orange scutellum which distinguishes it from the only other species of Penthe in North America: Penthe pimelia.

References

Further reading

External links

 

Tenebrionoidea
Articles created by Qbugbot
Beetles described in 1801